The men's 100 metre butterfly S9 event at the 2012 Paralympic Games took place on 30 August, at the London Aquatics Centre.

Two heats were held with eight swimmers in each. The swimmers with the eight fastest times advanced to the final.

Heats

Heat 1

Heat 2

Final

References
Official London 2012 Paralympic Results

Swimming at the 2012 Summer Paralympics